Maja Vukoces is a mountain in northern Albania in the Accursed Mountains range with a height of 2,450m. It lies close to the border with Montenegro, about 7 km southwest of the village Vusanje. Like others in the range, it too has a steep, rocky summit. It is even more difficult to climb it at winter when the snow and ice make the route to the peak and summit impossible to reach.

References

External links
Summitpost, Maja Vukoces

Mountains of Albania
Accursed Mountains